Olanta is an unincorporated community in Clearfield County, Pennsylvania, United States. Olanta has a post office, with ZIP code 16863.

References

Unincorporated communities in Clearfield County, Pennsylvania
Unincorporated communities in Pennsylvania